Overjoy is a Paris, France and Los Angeles, California–based band, consisting of singer-songwriter-producer Lex Famous (Alexis Moraites) and beatmaker and multi-instrumentalist Mettybeats (Daniel Atilano)

Career

The outfit of longtime friends unveiled their debut 'Breakfast EP' last year via Sweat It Out. Hailed by Thump for its "feel-good vibrations," the two-track release displayed Overjoy's range in sound design by mixing drums, synths and guitars into their electronic productions. Overjoy's live performances incorporate Vintage Synthesizers, drum machines, Midi-controllers, and electric guitar and vocals by singer-songwriter Lex Famous (Alexis Moraites). Prior to their 2015 debut EP, Overjoy's singles had received worldwide radio attention seeing regular plays from tastemaker stations Triple J, KCRW, and Berlin's Nightflight.

The summer of 2016 saw Overjoy self-releasing their three-track sophomore EP 'Another' with accompanying music videos for each track. In 2017, Overjoy released back to back new singles in "Dragonfly" and "Women", as well as debuting their new live show at Goldenvoice's summer festival Splash House in Palm Springs, Ca. 2018 has the band releases two more new singles in the 1st quarter, "Same" and "Nobody Dances".

In 2018, "Same" went on to receive a coveted slot abord Apple Music's The Lounge Playlist, this and Spotify helped propel the duo's streams to over five million worldwide, hitting some 110 countries across the world partly because of their partnership with Warner Music Australia via Sweat It Out, based in Sydney, a very important label in the worldwide electronic dance music market - helping already launch the careers of RUFUS DU SOL, and Yolanda Be Cool, Etc. 

2018 saw only one live show in producer Mettybeats hometown of Los Angeles, the band played for a sold out crowd at Hwood Group's The Pepperment Club in West Hollywood. Tow days after Dave Chappell and Drake headlined the venue. The night turned out to be extra special as a surprise opening set by soul legend Bill Withers set the mood for the evening headlined by Overjoy performing fully live with all original members - and co-headlined by LA's Best DJ Thee Mike B and local legends Lisbona Sisters.

Additionally a radio premiere on LA's Morning Becomes Eclectic, hosted by legendary LA staple Jason Bentley helped secure the deal for the band in their hometown. Over 100 more spins on 89.9 KCRW in Santa Monica followed helping propel the band even further into the lexicon and on the tongues of music lovers and DJs internationally. Editorial features in Flaunt Magazine and Vice's Noisey followed also helping push their sound in new ears across the globe. This was truly beginning to become a universal enterprise as the band's motto from day one was #LOVEEVERYBODY. 

2019 saw the release of "Sey U Want Me Back" - the band's first release as a duo. It received a primetime slot on West LA's cutting edge dance station FREAKS ONLY FM hosted by DJ and presenter Travis Holcombe, as did the recedding single "Nobody Dances" both released through InGROOVES distribution home to labels such as Stones Throw, etc. 

In 2020, the duo received amazing news that they had been handpicked to play at Okeechobee Festival in Okeechobee, Florida. It was a true homecoming for singer Lex Famous, and they were more than thrilled to be on the lineup with Australian friends and label mates Rufus Du Sol and Crooked Colors.  The duo played a laid play DJ set that created a legion of new friends and fans. Also on the bill were Mumford & Sons, Vampire Weekend, Ghostland Observatory, GUNNA, Durante, The Phamtoms, Blood Orange, Bob Moses, Moonboots, and Soul Clap. The show truly was a amazing experience but it was all bittersweet as the COVID lockdowns that would plague our society for two years begin just as the duo arrived back in LA - Everything had changed and nothing would ever be the same again.

Discography 
Studio EPs
 Breakfast (Sweat It Out Music · 2015)
 Another (Field Notes · 2016)
Singles
 "Monstrous" (Club Sweat · 2014)
 "Stop" (Club Sweat · 2014)
 "Chase The Devil" (Sweat it Out Music · 2014)
 "Like A Wave" (Field Notes · 2015)
 "Dragonfly" (Field Notes · 2017)
 "Women" (Field Notes · 2017)
 "Same" (Field Notes · 2018)
 "Nobody Dances" (Field Notes · 2018)

References

External links 
 https://thump.vice.com/en_us/track/los-angeles-newcomers-overjoy-are-here-to-steal-your-ears-with-debut-ep-on-sweat-it-out
 http://earmilk.com/2015/12/11/breakfast-with-overjoy-a-new-ep-and-exclusive-mix/
 https://www.kcrw.com/@@playlists?channel=Simulcast&host=&show=&hour=&advanced=on&album_song_artist=Overjoy&label=&from_date=&to_date=
 http://www.abc.net.au/triplej/houseparty/blog/s4135874.htm
 http://www.abc.net.au/triplej/houseparty/blog/s4119103.htm
 http://www.andrelangenfeld.de/
 http://kickkicksnare.com/2015/12/05/overjoy-breakfast-ep/
 http://stoneyroads.com/2015/12/overjoy-releases-lush-breakfast-ep-on-sweat-it-out
 http://www.magneticmag.com/2016/01/magnetic-magazine-guest-podcast-overjoy/

American electronic music groups
Musical groups established in 2014
Musical groups from Los Angeles
2014 establishments in California